= Coppa del Mediterraneo =

The Coppa del Mediterraneo was a summer association football friendly tournament that took place in Genoa, Italy, from 1990 to 1994. The tournament were played at the Stadio Marassi.

In 1990 the teams played 2 round-robin matches. Since 1992 the teams played 3 round-robin 45-minute matches. If any match ended in a draw, it was decided by penalties.

== Finals ==
Year	Champion	Runners-Up	Third place	Fourth place
1990	(Italy) Torino F.C.	(France) Olympique de Marseille	(Spain) Atlético Madrid	(Italy) Genoa C.F.C.
1991	Not played.			
1992	(Italy) A.C. Milan	(Italy) S.S.C. Napoli	(Italy) Genoa C.F.C.	-
1993	Not played.			
1994	(Italy) A.C. Milan	(Greece) Panathinaikos F.C.	(Italy) Genoa C.F.C.	-
